Ekrem İmamoğlu (born 4 June 1970) is a Turkish businessman, real estate developer, and social democratic politician serving as the 32nd Mayor of Istanbul. He was first elected with 4.1 million votes and won with a margin of 13,000 votes against his AKP opponent in the March 2019 mayoral election as the joint Nation Alliance candidate of the Republican People's Party (CHP) and the Good Party, but served only from 17 April 2019 until 6 May 2019, when the election was annulled. He was then reelected in a renewed election on 23 June 2019 by an even larger margin of 800,000 votes. He had previously been the Mayor of Beylikdüzü, a western district of Istanbul, between 2014 and 2019.

İmamoğlu emerged as a dark horse candidate to be the Nation Alliance's joint candidate for Istanbul Mayor, overtaking more prominent contenders such as Muharrem İnce, the CHP's 2018 presidential candidate. On the eve of the elections, İmamoğlu gained a narrow lead in the mayoral race, with initial results showing his lead to be around 23,000 votes. His lead was eventually cut to 13,729 after a series of recounts backed by the government.

İmamoğlu was sworn in as Mayor of Istanbul on 17 April, following the conclusion of all recounts. On 6 May 2019, the Supreme Electoral Council convened and voted to annul the results of the mayoral election. Members of the Council accepted the Justice and Development Party's objection to the local election results in Istanbul, with seven members of the High Court voting in favour of calling a new election and four against. The election board also cancelled İmamoğlu's mayoral certificate until the renewed elections. A new election took place on 23 June 2019 in which İmamoğlu was re-elected as the mayor by a margin of approximately 800,000 votes. He was sworn into office on 27 June 2019. Because of the scale of his victory and popularity, he has been called a possible candidate for the Turkish presidency in the next elections.

On trial since January 2022 for "insulting electoral officials," İmamoğlu was sentenced to 2 years, 7 months, and 15 days of prison and was further banned from politics by a judge on 14 December 2022. The political ban has not yet been enacted as it must first be upheld by the court of appeals and the Court of Cassation.

Early life
İmamoğlu was born in June 1970, in the town of Akçaabat, west of the city Trabzon, in Turkey, to a religious family. During early childhood, he lived in the rural communities Cevizli and Yıldızlı, southwest of Akçaabat. He graduated from Trabzon High School, where he played amateur football and handball. After his graduation from Trabzon High School, he studied at the Girne American University in Kyrenia, Northern Cyprus and he played as a goalkeeper at Türk Ocağı Limasol S.K. In 1987 his family moved to Istanbul. He attended Istanbul University, and received a Bachelor's degree in business administration and a Master's degree in human resource management. Following his graduation, he joined his family's business in construction. In 1995, he married Dilek Kaya, and together they have three children. In 2002 he became a board member of Trabzonspor, and he was also a vice president of the Trabzonspor B.K. basketball team.

Political career
Since İmamoğlu's father was a member of the Motherland Party (ANAP), İmamoğlu briefly participated in the youth wing of the party in early 1990s although his mother's family was supportive of Republican People's Party. İmamoğlu joined the Republican People's Party (CHP) in 2008, and was elected as the head of the party's youth wing in 2009. On 16 September 2009, he was selected by the CHP as the president of party's local chapter in the Istanbul district of Beylikdüzü. He was then reelected to this position on 8 March 2012, before resigning on 15 July 2013 to run for mayor of Beylikdüzü. The election was held on 30 March 2014, as part of the 2014 Turkish local elections, and İmamoğlu won with 50.44% of the vote, defeating the incumbent AKP candidate Yusuf Uzun.

Following the announcement of Istanbul Municipality Mayor Kadir Topbaş's resignation on 23 September 2017, İmamoğlu was nominated by the CHP to replace him. In the Istanbul Municipal Assembly election to fulfill the remainder of Topbaş's term, İmamoğlu lost to the AKP candidate Mevlüt Uysal after three rounds, by a mostly party-line vote of 125 to 179.

2019 mayoral elections 

The CHP again nominated İmamoğlu for the 2019 Istanbul mayoral election on 18 December 2018. Both the Good Party, which formed an alliance with the CHP, and Peoples' Democratic Party (HDP) declined to nominate candidates, which may have increased support for İmamoğlu.

In the run-up to the elections, his campaign received worldwide attention for its mild-mannered and unifying approach, resulting in a narrowing of opinion polls against his rival, People's Alliance candidate Binali Yıldırım. The election was held on 31 March 2019, with İmamoğlu defeating AK Party candidate Binali Yıldırım by roughly 25,000 votes according to the election day totals released by the Supreme Electoral Council. Following his upset victory in which the ruling AKP significantly outspent him and received more media coverage, İmamoğlu was called a rising star in Turkish politics and a potential candidate to challenge Recep Tayyip Erdoğan in the 2023 Turkish presidential election.

The AK Party disputed the election results on behalf of its candidate, alleging that invalid votes may have swayed the election, and erected large posters in the city proclaiming Yıldırım as the election's winner. İmamoğlu, in turn, accused the AK Party of being "bad losers." Following a government-backed recount, İmamoğlu's lead was reduced to roughly 16,000 votes.

Mayor of Istanbul 

İmamoğlu was sworn in as Mayor of Istanbul on 17 April, 17 days after the election, following the conclusion of all recounts. His mayoral tenure came to an end when on 6 May 2019, the Supreme Electoral Council annulled the election results and removed him as Mayor of Istanbul. According to the YSK, the decision was taken because some presiding officers and polling staff were not civil servants. Turkish law stipulates they must be civil servants. However, many have called this action as a move to undo the will of the voters, who handed a narrow but fiercely contested victory to the opposition candidate. Ali Yerlikaya was named the interim mayor by the Interior Ministry of Turkey on 7 May 2019.

A new election was held on 23 June 2019, in which İmamoğlu was re-elected as the mayor of Istanbul, with a lead of more than 800,000 votes this time. Following his second loss to İmamoğlu, Yıldırım conceded defeat and also congratulated İmamoğlu on his re-election as mayor of Istanbul. Erdoğan also congratulated İmamoğlu and acknowledged that he won the election. İmamoğlu was then sworn into office on 27 June 2019. The same day he also received his mayoral certificate for the second time.

Environmental actions
İmamoğlu started a continuous bottom mud cleaning in the Golden Horn, which was frequently on the agenda with water pollution. After a long time, the Golden Horn regained its natural vitality, with fish swimming and dolphins racing. The phaeton transportation, which has been the subject of discussion for many years in the Princes' Islands, with both the conditions of horses and the infectious diseases that adversely affect public health, has left its place to nature-friendly electric vehicles as a result of the "Prince's Islands Transportation Workshop". Against the earthquake risk, which is the top priority of Istanbul, risky areas and rotten buildings are detected with detection scans all over the city. İmamoğlu has been highly critical of the Turkish government's plans to build the Istanbul canal, which would link the Sea of Marmara and the Black Sea through a second waterway beside the natural Bosphorus.

Socioeconomic actions

The People's Milk project that started for children to have access to milk has reached more than 130 thousand children. The People's Milk project has been launched to prevent malnutrition, one of the most important dangers of urban poverty, and to provide economic and psychological support to families, also to support local  dairy farmers. Milk, which is procured from producers in Çatalca and Silivri, providing a budget of more than 3 million liras to the local economy, is delivered to children in Istanbul as a reliable and healthy food source. "Istanbul is our Home" kindergartens, which provide equal opportunities in education for children who are deprived of pre-school education and their families, were established as centers that were meticulously planned in accordance with the physical and social needs of children. In Istanbul, which hosts the leading universities of Turkey, education support scholarships were provided to 63 thousand students for the first time in the history of Istanbul. With the monthly student subscription fee reduced from 80 TL to 50 TL, Istanbul became the city that provides the cheapest student transportation in Turkey. Regional Employment Offices, one of the important projects implemented by IMM, enabled more than 17 thousand citizens to participate in employment as of June 2021. Mothers with children aged 0–4 residing in Istanbul were given free public transportation right in Istanbul. The Mother Card, which increases the participation of mothers in social life and contributes to the family economy, has been used more than 8 million times to date. An online aid campaign has been launched, calling on better-off residents to help financially troubled dwellers in paying their unpaid bills, as the coronavirus pandemic has strained many households in Turkey's largest city. People who want to help can participate in solidarity through a reliable platform by donating whatever they want from the Family Support, Mother-Baby and Student Support packages prepared by IMM to deliver to those in need. People's Bread project turned into a social aid campaign spontaneously after İmamoğlu thanked a benevolent Istanbulite for demanding that all bread in a mobile Halk Ekmek kiosk be paid for and delivered to those in need. The support given by philanthropists to deliver them to families in need has exceeded 1 million lira in total. The water bills of Istanbul residents were reduced by up to 34% and the human right to water was introduced for every Istanbulite. Accordingly, 0.5 cubic meters, or 500 liters, of every 2.5 cubic meters of water consumed in residences is now considered a "human right to water". 9 years after this right was accepted at the UN Human Rights Council, Istanbul residents are starting to get their rights for the first time. IMM gives priority to women's cooperatives in the products to be supplied to families in need, with the movement it started throughout Turkey, especially in Istanbul, for the participation of women in production and the evaluation of women's labor. The Newborn Support Package was launched to support families in need. Packages containing everything that a baby and a mother will need in the first 4 months, from feeding bottles to thermometers, from booties to pajamas, from baby shampoo to diapers and family training books, have reached the first families and the distribution of new ones continues. In addition, the families that the package reaches are visited by experts for a year, and their needs are determined.

Constructions and infrastructure 
Esenler Coach Terminal, where many newcomers to Istanbul were welcomed for the first time and which has been on the agenda for many years with its abandoned and dangerous condition, has become a safe and comfortable terminal as a result of a detailed project design. The floods, which occurred after the rain in most parts of the city and caused great financial losses to the Istanbulites, were largely eliminated. As of December 2020, works were completed in 63 of 104 chronically flooded locations in Istanbul under the coordination of IMM. Haliç Shipyard, which has not been operated for many years and is on the verge of closure, has gained life both historically and functionally with meticulous work done by IMM. The shipyard also undertakes the production of Sea Taxis, which will be put into service by IMM in the near future. As a result of the works that started with the aim of IMM focusing on rail systems in the new period and making rail systems the backbone of public transportation, Imamoğlu claimed on Twitter that Istanbul became the city with the most subway constructions carried out at the same time. Due to the lack of funds for a long time, the 103.4-kilometer-long metro construction in 10 metro lines, most of which was incomplete or never started, was stopped. Funds were provided from financial institutions, which gained the trust of the management approach based on transparency and merit in Istanbul, for the move that put an end to a waste of 11 billion liras. Eminönü-Alibeyköy Tram Line, which was stopped due to financing problems, was completed in the new period of IMM and opened to the service of Istanbulites.

Cultural projects 
IMM purchased the 540-year-old portrait of Mehmed the Conqueror at an auction opened by the London National Gallery. Two different projects have been implemented to support musicians and theaters who have been subjected to a difficult process due to the pandemic, which caused the cultural and artistic activities to come to a complete halt.

Agriculture and farming 
To support farmers, IMM gave animal feed and seedlings to 474 producers . 16,380 tons of crops were obtained in 2020 with the re-introduction of agricultural lands that were left idle.

Alleged assassination attempt 
On 1 December 2020, OdaTV reported that the Islamic State plotted to assassinate İmamoğlu. It was reported that a group of ISIS militants had been caught. Also, İmamoğlu's security guards had been instructed to “be more careful” on 23 November 2020.The Interior Minister Süleyman Soylu said: "We receive intelligence like this from time to time, but they are not disclosed to the public," but the Turkish Police denied that an assassination attempt was in place. It also refuted claims that the assassins were apprehended.

Trial 

On 14 December 2022, Ekrem İmamoğlu was sentenced to two years in prison for calling the Turkish Supreme Election Council "fools" three years ago. The ruling has been seen as an attempt by the Erdoğan government to centralize power against popular opposition, and remove a potential political rival. The trial drew wide international condemnation, and protests were organized in front of the Istanbul Municipality in response to it. Additionally, European mayors gathered in Istanbul in a show of support.

2023 Presidential elections 
For the 2023 Turkish presidential elections, leader of Republican People's Party, Kemal Kılıçdaroğlu declared his candidacy. Ekrem İmamoğlu, Mansur Yavaş and the leaders of five parties in the Nation Alliance were named as vice-president candidates.

Political views 

İmamoğlu describes himself as a social democrat and that he became a social democrat during his education in Cyprus after being influenced by his friends. He is a member of the Kemalist organization Atatürkist Thought Association. In an act which was deemed as opposition to corruption, he displayed columns with hundreds of cars at the Yenikapı Square which were rented by the administration he succeeded. İmamoğlu has also condemned the government's ban of a Kurdish-language adaption of Dario Fo's Trumpets and Raspberries over its alleged support of the Kurdistan Workers' Party (PKK). At a Mayors summit in Copenhagen, Denmark he joined forces with other Mayors and discussed how to make their cities better prepared for climate change. İmamoğlu was awarded the Kybele German-Turkish Friendship Award in November 2019. The award was presented to İmamoğlu by former German President Christian Wulff.

See also 
 Canan Kaftancıoğlu
AK Trolls

References

External links

Official website

1970 births
Living people
Turkish Muslims
Istanbul University alumni
People from Trabzon
Republican People's Party (Turkey) politicians
Mayors of places in Turkey
Mayors of Istanbul
21st-century Turkish politicians
Turkish businesspeople
Turkish secularists
Critics of Islamism